In contract law or tort law, the term heads of loss or heads of claim refers to categories of damage that a party may incur.  It uses the term "head" in its sense of "category"; each head of loss refers to the damages that correspond to a particular category of duty.

Contract law

When used in the context of contracts, "loss" is the equivalent of damages at common law. The measure of such damages can be complex, but the starting position is to put the injured party in the same position (so far as money can accomplish) as if the contract had been correctly performed

For example, a book on "Building Contract Claims" lists the following "more common heads of loss":
 On-site establishment costs
 Head office overheads
 Loss of profit
 Inefficient or increased use of labour and plant
 Winter working
 Plant
 Increased costs
 Financing charges and interest

See also
Duty of care
Reliance damages

References

Contract law
Tort law